Hamblin Bay is a bay of Lake Mead on the Colorado River, to the east of Las Vegas and Callville Bay in the U.S. state of Nevada. It lies between Sandy Cove which lies to the west and Rotary Cove and Rufus Cove which lie to the east. Hamblin Bay is also a fault of the same name in the vicinity, which "strikes at a low angle to the easternmost mapped branch of the Las Vegas Shear Zone".

Name
It is named after Mormon missionary William Haynes Hamblin.

References

External links
Photograph

Bays of Nevada
Lake Mead
Lakes of Clark County, Nevada